The 2010 FIFA World Cup CONCACAF–CONMEBOL qualification play-off were a series of two-legged home-and-away ties between the fourth-placed team of the CONCACAF qualifying tournament, Costa Rica, and the fifth-placed team from the South American qualifying tournament, Uruguay.

The games were played on 14 and 18 November 2009. In the first leg, held in San José, Uruguay beat Costa Rica 1–0, while in the second leg played at Estadio Centenario in Montevideo, both teams tied 1–1. Uruguay won the series 2–1 on aggregate and qualified for the 2010 World Cup.

Overview
It was the third consecutive FIFA World Cup play-off that Uruguay has participated in after 3–1 on aggregate win over Australia for Korea/Japan 2002 and losing to Australia 4–2 on penalties for Germany 2006.

The draw for the order in which the two matches would be played was held on 2 June 2009 during the FIFA Congress in Nassau, The Bahamas.

Venues

Match details

First leg

Second leg

Broadcasting rights

Americas  
  Brazil: SporTV

References

play-off
4
Play-Off
Playoff World Cup 2010
World Cup 2010 Playoff
2009–10 in Uruguayan football
2009–10 in Costa Rican football
FIFA World Cup qualification inter-confederation play-offs
November 2009 sports events in North America
November 2009 sports events in South America
2010s in Montevideo
21st century in San José, Costa Rica
International association football competitions hosted by Costa Rica
International association football competitions hosted by Uruguay